
New England Valkyries Rugby Football Club were a rugby union football club mainly based in Boston, Massachusetts.

Members
The New England Valkyries were a primarily gay-identified but all-inclusive team.  They had a diverse group of players:  gay, straight, bi-sexual, young, old, experienced, and newbie.

History
The Valkyries formed in September 2013. Some of its members are former Boston Ironsides RFC members.

In May 2013, before forming as an officially recognized IGRAB team, the Valkyries first played in the Chicago Combustion Tournament.  At the time, they were a barbarian rugby team composed mostly of current Boston Ironsides players. They finished in 2nd place (out of 7 teams) and took home a trophy from the 2013 Chicago Combustion tournament.

In November 2013, the Valkyries came in 2nd place (out of 3 teams) in the Charlotte Tourney.

Affiliations
The Valkyries were members of:
 International Gay Rugby Association and Board (IGRAB) (associate membership, pending full membership)
 USA Rugby

External links
New England Valkyries RFC

International Gay Rugby member clubs
Rugby union teams in Boston
Rugby clubs established in 2013
2013 establishments in Massachusetts
LGBT culture in Boston